Bible Grove Township is one of twelve townships in Clay County, Illinois, USA.  As of the 2010 census, its population was 344 and it contained 168 housing units.

Geography

Unincorporated towns
 Bible Grove
(This list is based on USGS data and may include former settlements.)

History - Grand Army of the Republic
 The G.A.R. had a post known as the Bible Grove Post, No. 360. It was organized by William Mattoon November 14, 1883, in Georgetown. It received its charter October 30, 1883. The following were charter members: Theoren Gould, John B. Cogswell, Elias Booze, James Connerley, Richard McWilliams, Leonard Wolf, William B. Corder, John Cottrell, S. G. Curtright, Henry Nash, M. N. Lewis, E. T. Ryan, William P. Lewis, Robert Carrick, Jesse B. Vickrey. Jacob Rinehart, Joseph Killifer, Joseph Harper and Joseph Cook. The first officers: Theoren Gould, Commander; John B. Cogswell, Senior Vice Commander; Henry Nash, Junior Vice Commander; Leonard Wolf, Adjutant; Moses M. Lewis, Quartermaster;John Cottrell, Surgeon; Richard McWilliams, Chaplain; Joseph Killifer. Officer of the Day; William B. Corder, Officer of the Guard; W. P. Lewis, Sergeant Mayor; Joseph Harper, Quartermaster Sergeant.
 In the book 'Proceedings And Official Reports Of The... Annual Encampment of The Department of Illinois G.A.R, Volumes 14-22' in a Report of the Assistant Adjutant General dated Chicago, January 31, 1886, was reported that Post 360 Bible Grove had surrendered their charter.

Cemeteries
The township contains these six cemeteries: Brooks, Burke, German, Lewis, Saint Paul and Shouse Chapel.

Demographics

School districts
 Clay City Community Unit District 10
 Dieterich Community Unit School District 30
 Jasper County Community Unit School District 1
 North Clay Community Unit School District 25

References
 
 United States Census Bureau 2007 TIGER/Line Shapefiles
 United States National Atlas

External links
 City-Data.com
 Illinois State Archives

Townships in Clay County, Illinois
Townships in Illinois